The Felt family is a family of politicians from the United States. Below is a list of members:

Peter Felt (1784-1866), New Hampshire State Representative 1825 1828-1829. First cousin of John Felt and Daniel Felt.
John Felt (1798-1887), New Hampshire State Representative. First cousin of Peter Felt and Daniel Felt.
Daniel Felt (1799-1882), New Hampshire State Representative 1855. First cousin of Peter Felt and John Felt.
Josiah Robbins (1761-1850), New Hampshire State Representative. Second cousin by marriage of Peter Felt, John Felt, and Daniel Felt.
Dorman Felt (1810-1876), Michigan State Representative 1859-1860. First cousin once removed of Peter Felt, John Felt, and Daniel Felt.
David Alvaro Felt (1820-1892), Commissioner of Sullivan County, New Hampshire; New Hampshire State Representative. First cousin once removed of Peter Felt, John Felt, and Daniel Felt.
Marcellus H. Felt, New Hampshire State Senator 1903-1904. Grandnephew of John Felt.
Jesse F. Libby, New Hampshire State Representative 1903 1905. Great-grandnephew of Peter Felt.
Andrew J. Felt, delegate to the Republican National Convention 1868 1872, Lieutenant Governor of Kansas 1889-1893. Third cousin thrice removed of Peter Felt, John Felt, and Daniel Felt.
William Howard Thompson (1871-1928), Attorney of Allen County, Kansas; District Court Judge in Kansas 1906-1913; U.S. Senator from Kansas 1913-1919; candidate for U.S. Representative from Kansas 1922. Son-in-law of Andrew J. Felt.

Other members of the Felt family include the following: 
Dorr Felt
Ephraim Porter Felt
Louie B. Felt
Mark Felt
Nathaniel H. Felt

See also
List of United States political families

References

Political families of the United States